In 1961, the United States FBI, under Director J. Edgar Hoover, continued for a twelfth year to maintain a public list of the people it regarded as the Ten Most Wanted Fugitives.

Throughout the year 1961, six of the ten places on the list remained filled by these elusive long-time fugitives from prior years, then still at large:

 1950 #14 (eleven years), Frederick J. Tenuto remains at large
 1952 #36 (nine years), James Eddie Diggs process dismissed December 14, 1961
 1954 #78 (seven years), David Daniel Keegan remains at large
 1956 #97 (five years), Eugene Francis Newman remains at large
 1960 #137 (one year), Donald Leroy Payne remains at large
 1960 #143 (one year), John B. Everhart remains at large

But with frequent ongoing captures leading to high turnover in the remaining four slots, in total, the FBI added 17 new fugitive Top Tenners to the list in 1961.  Halfway through the year, there was another "first" for the top Ten list, as Richard Laurence Marquette became the FBI's first "special addition," bringing the total number count of wanted fugitives up to eleven on a temporary basis in 1961.

1961 Fugitives
The Ten Most Wanted Fugitives listed by the FBI in 1961 include (in FBI list appearance sequence order):

Thomas Viola
January 17, 1961 #146
Two months on the list
Thomas Viola - U.S. prisoner arrested March 27, 1961, in Detroit, Michigan, after a citizen recognized his photo in
an article in American Weekly

William Chester Cole
February 2, 1961 #147
Four days on the list
William Chester Cole - U.S. prisoner surrendered February 6, 1961, to FBI Agents in Gulf Breeze, Florida. Cole said the "heat" of the investigation was too much.

Willie Hughes
March 15, 1961 #148
Five months on the list
Willie Hughes - U.S. prisoner arrested August 8, 1961, in Pocatello, Idaho, where he had been working as a farm laborer

William Terry Nichols
April 6, 1961 #149
One year on the list
William Terry Nichols - U.S. prisoner arrested April 30, 1962, near Homestead, Florida, where he had started a commercial fishing business

George Martin Bradley
April 10, 1961 #150
Three weeks on the list
George Martin Bradley - U.S. prisoner arrested May 1, 1961, in Davenport, Iowa, by local police officers and identified after routine fingerprinting following an attempted bank robbery

Philip Alfred LaNormandin
April 17, 1961 #151
One day on the list
Philip Alfred LaNormandin - U.S. prisoner arrested April 17, 1961, in Jersey City, New Jersey, the same day, when only a few hours following the announcement to the "Top Ten" list, a local resident recognized his photograph in the evening newspaper

Kenneth Holleck Sharp
May 1, 1961 #152
Two months on the list
Kenneth Holleck Sharp - U.S. prisoner arrested July 3, 1961, in Philadelphia, Pennsylvania, after a citizen recognized his
photograph in the Master Detective magazine

Anthony Vincent Fede
May 22, 1961 #153
Five months on the list
Anthony Vincent Fede - U.S. prisoner captured October 28, 1961, in Los Angeles, California, by FBI Agents while he was 
carrying a toy pistol and a fake police badge. He said, "I should have given myself up."

Richard Laurence Marquette
June 29, 1961 #154, first "special addition"
One day on the list
Richard Laurence Marquette - U.S. prisoner arrested June 30, 1961, in Santa Maria, California, by the FBI after a citizen
recognized his photograph on a wanted flyer posted in a credit bureau;  He was the first "special addition" to the list, bringing the actively wanted total count of Fugitives on the list up to eleven for a short period of time

Robert William Schuette
July 19, 1961 #155
Two weeks on the list
Robert William Schuette - U.S. prisoner arrested August 2, 1961, in Chicago, Illinois. He had shaved his sideburns and
mustache and changed his address 40 times to avoid being recognized. He congratulated the FBI saying "You fellows sure did a good job." In his pocket was a news clipping with picture telling of his addition to the "Ten Most Wanted Fugitives" list two weeks prior.

Chester Anderson McGonigal
August 14, 1961 #156
Three days on the list
Chester Anderson McGonigal - U.S. prisoner arrested August 17, 1961, in Denver, Colorado, by FBI after a citizen recognized his photograph in a newspaper

Hugh Bion Morse
August 29, 1961 #157
Two months on the list
Hugh Bion Morse - U.S. prisoner arrested October 13, 1961, in St. Paul, Minnesota, the evening after a visitor to the FBI
Tour in Washington, D. C. recognized his photo displayed on the "Top Ten" Exhibit.  Morse died while incarcerated at the Minnesota Correctional Facility-Faribault in 2003.

John Gibson Dillon
September 1, 1961 #158
Three years on the list
John Gibson Dillon - Found murdered March 2, 1964, on a remote farm in Chelsea, Oklahoma, his badly decomposed body located at the bottom of a 15-feet, water-filled well, with 
400 pounds of oil well drilling equipment wired to his feet and body

John Robert Sawyer
October 30, 1961 #159
Four days on the list
John Robert Sawyer - U.S. prisoner arrested November 3, 1961, in Wickenburg, Arizona, by a local police officer who recognized his vehicle in an all points bulletin issued by the FBI

Edward Wayne Edwards
November 10, 1961 #160
Two months on the list
Edward Wayne Edwards - U.S. prisoner arrested January 20, 1962, in Atlanta, Georgia, by local police.

Franklin Eugene Alltop
November 22, 1961 #161
Three months on the list
Franklin Eugene Alltop - U.S. prisoner arrested February 2, 1962, in Kansas City, Kansas. Alltop greeted the arresting Special Agents with, "I've been expecting you, I know you're
the FBI."

Francis Laverne Brannan
December 27, 1961 #162
One month on the list
Francis Laverne Brannan - U.S. prisoner surrendered January 18, 1962, to the FBI in Miami, Florida. Calling from a phone at a downtown gas station, Brannan told them "Come and get me, I'm tired of running from the FBI."

Later entries
FBI Ten Most Wanted Fugitives, 2020s
FBI Ten Most Wanted Fugitives, 2010s
FBI Ten Most Wanted Fugitives, 2000s
FBI Ten Most Wanted Fugitives, 1990s
FBI Ten Most Wanted Fugitives, 1980s
FBI Ten Most Wanted Fugitives, 1970s
FBI Ten Most Wanted Fugitives, 1960s

Prior entries
FBI Ten Most Wanted Fugitives, 1950s

External links
Current FBI top ten most wanted fugitives at FBI site
FBI pdf source document listing all Ten Most Wanted year by year (removed by FBI)

 
1961 in the United States